Meclonazepam ((S)-3-methylclonazepam) was discovered by a team at Hoffmann-La Roche in the 1970s and is a drug which is a benzodiazepine derivative similar in structure to clonazepam. It has sedative and anxiolytic actions like those of other benzodiazepines, and also has anti-parasitic effects against the parasitic worm Schistosoma mansoni.

Meclonazepam was never used as medicine and instead appeared online as a designer drug.

Legal Issues

United Kingdom 
In the UK, meclonazepam has been classified as a Class C drug by the May 2017 amendment to The Misuse of Drugs Act 1971 along with several other designer benzodiazepine drugs.

See also 
 3-Hydroxyphenazepam
 Desmethylflunitrazepam
 Nifoxipam
 Oxazepam
 Phenazepam
 Ro05-4082
 SH-I-048A

References

Further reading 

 

Chloroarenes
Designer drugs
GABAA receptor positive allosteric modulators
Lactams
Nitrobenzodiazepines